Bunamwaya Stadium is a multi-purpose stadium in Wakiso Town, Uganda.  It is currently used mostly for football matches and serves as the home venue of Bunamwaya SC of the Ugandan Super League.  The stadium has a capacity of 5,000 people.

References

Football venues in Uganda
Multi-purpose stadiums in Uganda